The term mixed-blood in the United States is most often employed for individuals of mixed European and Native American ancestry.

Mixed blood may also refer to:

 Mixed Blood (album), a 2007 remix and cover album of songs originally by Gotye
 Mixed Blood (1916 film), a 1916 film by  Charles Swickard
 Mixed Blood (1985 film), a 1985 film by Paul Morrissey
 Mixed Blood Theatre Company, a professional multiracial theatre company in Minneapolis, Minnesota